The Union of Arab National Olympic Committees (acronym: UANOC) is an international organization that unites the 22 National Olympic Committees (NOCs) of the Arab world. It is headquartered in Riyadh, Saudi Arabia.

History
In May 1976, in a conference of Arab olympic committees held in Riyadh (Saudi Arabia), members decided to establish a union called the Arab Sports Confederation (ASC). The goals of the confederation are the advancement of the Olympic movement and sports in the Arab countries, develop and maintain the rules and principles of the Olympic, encourage and protect the hobby, as well as cooperation with the Arab and international sports organizations. Riyadh was chosen as the headquarters of the confederation and Prince Faisal bin Fahd was elected as its President until his death in 1999. The Arab Sports Confederation changed its name to Union of Arab National Olympic Committees (UANOC) in 2008.

Activities
The most important activities of the union, attend international and continental meetings that act for youth and sports both, contribute to the organization of Arab sports tournaments, supervision and the establishment of tournaments, seminars, sports medicine and sports media, management and administration and sports photography.

Member countries

Events
 Pan Arab Games

See also
 African Games
 Asian Games

References

External links
 Official website
 Qatar sign hosts 2011 Pan Arab Games (sportbusiness.com)
 Executive Bureau of the union in Jeddah (Alriyadh Newspaper)
 Arab Games 2011 put back one month (Olympic Council of Asia)
 http://www.uanoc.org/members/managers

Olympic organizations
Pan-Arabism
Organisations based in Saudi Arabia
Sports organizations established in 1976